In enzymology, a cyclamate sulfohydrolase is an enzyme that catalyzes the chemical reaction

cyclohexylsulfamate + H2O  cyclohexylamine + sulfate

Thus, the two substrates of this enzyme are cyclohexylsulfamate and H2O, whereas its two products are cyclohexylamine and sulfate.

This enzyme belongs to the family of hydrolases, specifically those acting on sulfur-nitrogen bonds.  The systematic name of this enzyme class is cyclohexylsulfamate sulfohydrolase. Other names in common use include cyclamate sulfamatase, cyclamate sulfamidase, and cyclohexylsulfamate sulfamidase.  This enzyme participates in caprolactam degradation.

References

 

EC 3.10.1
Enzymes of unknown structure